Gil Dudson (born 16 June 1990) is a Welsh professional rugby league footballer who plays as a  for the Warrington Wolves in the Betfred Super League and Wales at international level.

He played for Crusaders RL in the Super League, and on loan from Crusaders at the South Wales Scorpions in Championship 1. Dudson has also played for the Wigan Warriors, Widnes Vikings, Salford Red Devils and the Catalans Dragons in the  top flight.

Background
Dudson was born in Trowbridge, Cardiff, Wales.

Club career

Celtic Crusaders
Dudson began his career at Celtic Crusaders, where he progressed through the youth ranks. He made his Super League début in the 2009 season in a fixture against Leeds. Dudson spent 2010 on loan at South Wales Scorpions, and was named in the Championship 1 team of the year at the end of the season. He returned to Crusaders in 2011 and made 12 further appearances for the club. At the end of the season, he joined Wigan Warriors along with international team-mate Ben Flower.

Wigan Warriors
Dudson featured for Wigan in the 2013 Challenge Cup Final victory over Hull F.C. at Wembley Stadium.

He played in the 2013 Super League Grand Final victory over the Warrington Wolves at Old Trafford.

Widnes Vikings
In January 2015, he signed for Widnes Vikings for the 2015 seasons on a two-year deal.

Salford Red Devils
He played in the 2019 Super League Grand Final defeat by St. Helens at Old Trafford.

Catalans Dragons
On 18 December 2020, it was announced that Dudson would join the Catalans Dragons for the 2021 season on a two-year contract.

On 9 October 2021, Dudson played for Catalans in their 2021 Super League Grand Final defeat against St Helens.

In round 1 of the 2022 Super League season, Dudson was sent to the sin bin within the first minute of the game in Catalans 28-8 loss against St Helens.

Warrington Wolves
On 23 May 2022, Dudson signed a contract to join Warrington for the 2023 Super League season.

International honours
Gil Dudson made his Wales début while at Celtic Crusaders in 2008.

He has since been a regular for Wales, and featured in their 2011 Four Nations campaign.

Gil played in all 3 of Wales' games in the 2013 Rugby League World Cup.

Gil did not play for Wales again until October 2016, where he was part of the Cymru's 2017 World Cup qualifying campaign. Gil scored a try in Wales' opening game against Serbia.

References

External links

Salford Red Devils profile
(archived by web.archive.org) Widnes Vikings profile
(archived by web.archive.org) Celtic Crusaders profile
SL profile

1987 births
Living people
Catalans Dragons players
Crusaders Rugby League players
Rugby league players from Cardiff
Rugby league props
Salford Red Devils players
South Wales Scorpions players
Wales national rugby league team players
Warrington Wolves players
Welsh rugby league players
Widnes Vikings players
Wigan Warriors players